In Brazil, public holidays may be legislated at the federal, statewide and municipal levels. Most holidays are observed nationwide.

Apart from the yearly official holidays (listed below), the Constitution of Brazil also establishes that election days are to be considered national holidays as well. General elections are biennially held on the first Sunday of October in the first round, and on the last Sunday of October in the second round. Numerous religious and ethnic holidays are also celebrated in Brazil.

Secondary holidays
 Fat Tuesday, The day of Carnival. 
 Ash Wednesday Wednesday after Carnival, the last Carnival day.
 Good Friday, the Friday preceding Easter Sunday, is a municipal holiday in many places.
 Dia das Mães, the Brazilian observation of Mother's Day, is celebrated every second Sunday in May.
 Corpus Christi is  celebrated on the Thursday, 60 days after Easter Sunday.
 Dia dos Namorados, the Brazilian equivalent of St. Valentine's Day, is observed on June 12. On this day, boyfriends and girlfriends, husbands and wives, exchange gifts, cards, or a flower bouquet. It is celebrated on the eve of St. Anthony of Padua's day, because, in Brazil, he is considered the patron of those who wants a loving companion.
 Festas Juninas, the Catholic feasts of Santo Antônio, São João and São Pedro are celebrated June 13, 24, and 29 respectively in many Brazilian cities, especially in the Northeast region.
 Dia dos Pais, the Brazilian observation of Father's Day, is celebrated every second Sunday in August.
 Dia das Crianças, the Brazilian Children's Day, is celebrated on October 12, coinciding with the feast of Our Lady of Aparecida.

Regional holidays

Federal law gives each state the right to create one state holiday, and each municipality to create up to four municipal holidays. Some of the more notable ones are:
 January 12: Founding of Belém, City of Belém only.
 January 20: Saint Sebastian (São Sebastião), City of Rio de Janeiro only.
 January 22: Founding of the first city in Brazil, São Vicente. City of São Vicente only.
 January 25: Founding of São Paulo (Aniversário de São Paulo), City of São Paulo only.
 January 26: Founding of Santos (Aniversario de Santos), City of Santos only.
 April 21: Founding of Brasilia (Aniversário de Brasília), coinciding with Tiradentes, Federal District only.
 April 23: Saint George (São Jorge), City of Rio de Janeiro only. In 2007, governor Sérgio Cabral expanded this holiday to all the State of Rio de Janeiro.
 July 2: Bahia Independence Day, State of Bahia only.
 July 8: Sergipe Political Emancipation Day, State of Sergipe only
 July 9: Constitutionalist Revolution (Revolução Constitucionalista), State of São Paulo only.
 August 15: Our Lady of the Good Voyage (Nossa Senhora da Boa Viagem), City of Belo Horizonte only.
 August 26: Emancipation of the city of Campo Grande, City of Campo Grande only.
 September 8: Our Lady of the Light in the Pine (Nossa Senhora da Luz dos Pinhais), City of Curitiba only.
 September 20: Farroupilha's Revolution (Revolução Farroupilha), State of Rio Grande do Sul only.
 October 11: Creation of the State of Mato Grosso do Sul, separated from Mato Grosso in 1977, State of Mato Grosso do Sul only.
 October 3: Uruaçú and Cunhaú Martyrs Day, State of Rio Grande do Norte only.
 October 24: Founding of Goiânia, City of Goiânia only.
 November 4: Founding of São Carlos, City of São Carlos only.
 November 20: Zumbi of Palmares, Black Awareness Day (Zumbi dos Palmares, Dia da Consciência Negra), cities of São Paulo and Rio de Janeiro only.
 November 21: Our Lady of Apresentação (Nossa Senhora da Apresentação) Day, City of  Natal only.
 November 30: Evangelical Day (Dia do Evangélico), Federal District only.
 December 8: Our Lady of Conceição (Dia de Nossa Senhora da Conceição), State of Pernambuco, City of Belo Horizonte, City of Dourados, and Cities of Santa Maria and São Leopoldo (Rio Grande do Sul) only.
 December 19: Emancipation of the Province of Paraná, State of Paraná only.

References

...

 
Brazil
Public holidays
Observances in Brazil
Brazilian entertainment-related lists
Holidays